Cedar Park is a historic home at Galesville, Anne Arundel County, Maryland, United States.  It was originally constructed in 1702 as a -story post-in-the-ground structure, with hand-hewn timbers and riven clapboards and chimneys at either end, the earliest surviving earthfast constructed dwelling in Maryland and Virginia.  Later additions and modifications, in 1736 and in the early 19th century, resulted in the brick structure of today.  Also on the property is a frame tenant house or slave quarters of the mid-19th century. It was the birthplace and home of Founding Father John Francis Mercer, and between 1825 and 1834 it was an academy for young women operated by his daughter, Margaret Mercer, as "Miss Mercer's School."

Cedar Park was listed on the National Register of Historic Places in 1969.

References

External links

, including undated photo, at Maryland Historical Trust

Houses on the National Register of Historic Places in Maryland
Houses in Anne Arundel County, Maryland
Historic American Buildings Survey in Maryland
National Register of Historic Places in Anne Arundel County, Maryland
1702 establishments in Maryland
Slave cabins and quarters in the United States
Homes of United States Founding Fathers